The quarterfinals of the FIBA European Championship 1992–93 were the third of four stages of the annual Europe-wide club basketball competition.

Each quarterfinal was a best-of-three series between the teams qualified from the regular season, with the higher-place team receiving home advantage. Quarterfinals were played on 11 and 16 March 1993, with third games played on the 17th and 18th if necessary.

The winning teams advanced to the final four, held 13 April through 15 April 1993 at the Peace and Friendship Stadium in Athens.

Seeded teams played games 2 and 3 at home.

|}

Quarterfinal 1
Game 1

Game 2

Quarterfinal 2
Game 1

Game 2

Game 3

Quarterfinal 3
Game 1

Game 2

Quarterfinal 4
Game 1

Game 2

Game 3

1992–93 FIBA European League
1992–93 in Greek basketball
1992–93 in Spanish basketball
1992–93 in Italian basketball
1992–93 in French basketball